Bon La (also Romanized as Bon Lā) is a village in Meymand Rural District, in the Central District of Shahr-e Babak County, Kerman Province, Iran. At the 2006 census, its population was 10, in 5 families.

References 

Populated places in Shahr-e Babak County